The North Central Association of Colleges and Schools (NCA), also known as the North Central Association, was a membership organization, consisting of colleges, universities, and schools in 19 U.S. states engaged in educational accreditation. It was one of six regional accreditation bodies in the U.S. and its Higher Learning Commission was recognized by the United States Department of Education and the Council for Higher Education Accreditation (CHEA) as a regional accreditor for higher education institutions.

The organization was dissolved in 2014.  The primary and secondary education accreditation functions of the association have been merged into AdvancED with the postsecondary education accreditation functions vested in the Higher Learning Commission.

See also
List of recognized accreditation associations of higher learning

References

External links

School accreditors
1895 establishments in Illinois
School accreditors in Chicago
College and university associations and consortia in the United States
Educational organizations based in the United States
2014 disestablishments in Illinois
Organizations established in 1895
Organizations disestablished in 2014